Sayeh Kor-e Olya (also Romanized as Sāyeh Kor-e ‘Olyā and Sāyehkor-e ‘Olyā' also known as Sādeh Kor-e ‘Olyā, Sāikūr, Sāyeh Gor-e Bālā, Sāyehkor-e Bālā, Sāyeh Kūr-e Bālā, and Sāyeh Kūr-e ‘Olyā) is a village in Agahan Rural District, Kolyai District, Sonqor County, Kermanshah Province, Iran. At the 2006 census, its population was 231, in 44 families.

References 

Populated places in Sonqor County